Chondrina tatrica is a species of small air-breathing land snail, a terrestrial pulmonate gastropod mollusk in the family Chondrinidae.

Distribution
The species occurs in:
 Slovakia
 Romania

References

Chondrinidae
Gastropods described in 1948
Taxobox binomials not recognized by IUCN